West Is West may refer to:

West Is West (1920 film), a 1920 American silent film
West Is West (2010 film), a 2010 British comedy-drama film